João Pimenta Lopes (born 12 April 1980) is a Portuguese politician, who, since January 2016, has served as a Member of the European Parliament, representing Portugal for the Portuguese Communist Party. He was appointed to replace Inês Zuber following her resignation.

On 2 March 2022, he was one of 13 MEPs who voted against condemning the Russian invasion of Ukraine.

On 15 September 2022, he was one of 16 MEPs who voted against condemning President Daniel Ortega of Nicaragua for human rights violations, in particular the arrest of Bishop Rolando Álvarez.

Parliamentary service
 Vice-Chair, Committee on Women's Rights and Gender Equality (2016-)
 Member, Delegation to the Euro-Latin American Parliamentary Assembly
 Member, Committee on Employment and Social Affairs
 Member, Delegation for relations with the Federative Republic of Brazil

References

External links
 

Living people
1980 births
People from Lisbon
MEPs for Portugal 2014–2019
Portuguese Communist Party MEPs